The  are botanical gardens operated by Osaka City University. They are near the Keihan-Kisaichi Station, Katano, Osaka, Japan and open to the public.

The gardens were established in 1950 and contain about 4500 species from around the world, including more than 1,000 species native to Japan. They also contain representatives of 11 Japanese forest types. The gardens' maple collection includes Acer insulare, A. pictum (mono), A. japonicum, A. sieboldianum, A. rufinerve, A. nipponicum, A. pycnanthum, A. carpinifolium and A. amoenum.

Research accomplishments include discovery of the fossil genus Metasequoia by Dr. Shigeru Miki, as well as ongoing activities in systematics, ecology, physiology, genetics, horticulture, and dendrology.

References and external links 
 Official web page (Japanese)
 Osaka City University
 Photographs of gardens' maples

See also 

 List of botanical gardens in Japan

Botanical gardens in Japan
Gardens in Osaka Prefecture
1950 establishments in Japan
Katano, Osaka